The Herald Journal is a newspaper in Logan, Utah, United States, and serves the Cache Valley area of Northern Utah and Southeastern Idaho which includes Cache County, Utah and Franklin County, Idaho. It is published three times each week and delivered via the mail on Tuesdays, Thursdays and Saturdays. Prior owner Pioneer News Group sold its papers to Adams Publishing Group in 2017.

As of early 2014, The Herald Journal had a daily circulation of about 16,215. As of 2019, The Herald Journal's general manager is Ben Kenfield, who replaced David Welsh, publisher and president since 2016. Its managing editor is Charles McCollum.

References

External links
 

Companies based in Utah
Daily newspapers published in the United States
Logan, Utah
Mass media in Salt Lake City
Newspapers published in Utah
Publications established in 1931
1931 establishments in Utah